Chicago Bay is a small bay on the North Shore of Lake Superior located at . Hovland, Minnesota, is nearby.

References

External links
NOAA Nautical Chart 14967

Bays of Minnesota
Bodies of water of Cook County, Minnesota
Bays of Lake Superior